The Romania women's national water polo team is the representative for Romania in international women's water polo.

European Championship record
2022 – 11th

References

External links

W
Women's national water polo teams
Women's sport in Romania